The wine/water paradox is an apparent paradox in probability theory.  It is stated by Michael Deakin as follows:

Calculation 
This calculation is the demonstration of the paradoxical conclusion when making use of the principle of indifference.

To recapitulate, We do not know , the wine to water ratio. 
When considering the numbers above, it is only know that it lies in an interval between the minimum of one quarter wine over three quarters water on one end (i.e. 25% wine), to the maximum of three quarters wine over one quarter water on the other (i.e. 75% wine). In term of ratios,  resp. .

Now, making use of the principle of indifference, we may assume that  is uniformly distributed. So the probability value is the number
 Prob

As a function of the threshold value , this is the linearly growing function that is  resp.  at the end points  resp. .

Consider the threshold , as in the example of the original formulation above. This is two parts wine vs. one part water, i.e. 66% wine. With this we conclude that 
 Prob. 

Now consider , the inverted ratio of water to wine but the equivalent wine/water mixture threshold. It lies between the inverted bounds. 
Again using the principle of indifference, we get 
 Prob. 

This is the function which is  resp.  at the end points  resp. .

Now taking the corresponding threshold  (also half as much water as wine). We conclude that
 Prob.

Paradoxical conclusion 
Since , we get 
 ,

a contradiction.

References

Probability theory paradoxes